Imminence is a Swedish metalcore band from Trelleborg, who formed in 2009.

History
The band was started in 2009 by Harald Barret, with singer Eddie Berg joining shortly after. They decided on the name Imminence in 2010. In 2012, Alex Arnoldsson and Peter Hanström joined the band.

In 2012, they released their debut EP, Born of Sirius, which was well received by fans and critics. That year, they were also selected to play at the Metaltown Festival, one of the largest music festivals in Sweden.

In 2013, Imminence signed a contract with We Are Triumphant Records, a sub-label for the Chicago-based record company Victory Records, where they released their second EP, Return for Helios, along with the single "Wine & Water". In 2014, they released their debut album, I, which was accompanied by a series of music videos shot by singer Eddie Berg.

Members
Current
 Eddie Berg – lead vocals, violin (2009–present)
 Harald Barret – lead guitar, backing vocals (2009–present)
 Alex Arnoldsson – rhythm guitar (2012–present)
 Peter Hanström – drums (2012–present)
 Christian Höijer – bass (2018–present)

Past
 Fredrik Rosdahl – bass (2009–2014)
 Max Holmberg – bass (2015–2018)

Timeline

Discography
Studio albums
2014: I (We Are Triumphant Records)
2017: This Is Goodbye
2019: Turn the Light On
2021: Heaven in Hiding
2023: Heaven in Hiding (Deluxe Edition)
EPs
2012: Born of Sirius
2013: Return to Helios (We Are Triumphant Records)
2015: Mark on My Soul
2020: Turn the Light On (Acoustic)
Singles
2013: "Wine & Water" (We Are Triumphant Records)
2015: "Mark on My Soul"
2015: "The Sickness" (Arising Empire)
2016: "Can We Give It All"
2018: "Paralyzed"
2019: "Infectious"
2019: "Saturated Soul"
2019: "Lighthouse"
2021: "Temptation"
2021: "Heaven in Hiding"
2021: "Ghost"
2021: "Chasing Shadows & Alleviate"
2023: "Jaded"

Music videos

References

External links
 

Swedish metalcore musical groups
2010 establishments in Sweden
Musical groups established in 2010
Arising Empire artists